The Apostolic Nunciature to Egypt is an ecclesiastical office of the Catholic Church in Egypt. It is a diplomatic post of the Holy See, whose representative is called the Apostolic Nuncio with the rank of an ambassador.

Representatives of the Holy See to Egypt
Apostolic delegates 
Jean-Baptiste Auvergne (29 March 1833 – 7 September 1836)
Perpetuo Guasco (7 June 1839 – 26 August 1859)
Paškal Vujičić (7 September 1860 – 6 August 1866)
Ljudevit Ćurčija (27 July 1866 – 1 May 1881)
Anacleto Chicaro (17 May 1881 – 5 October 1888)
Guido Corbelli (9 Oct 1888 – 22 June 1896)
Gaudenzio Bonfigli (25 February 1896 – 6 April 1904)
Aurelio Briante (23 July 1904 – February 1921)
Andrea Cassulo (24 January 1921 – 7 May 1927)
Valerio Valeri (18 October 1927 – 3 April 1933)
Riccardo Bartoloni (9 April 1933 – 11 October 1933)
Torquato Dini (12 November 1933 – 26 March 1934)
Gustavo Testa (4 June 1934 – 23 August 1947)
He continued as apostolic delegate to several countries when he lost responsibility for Egypt with the erection of a nunciature and the appointment of an internuncio.
Apostolic internuncios
Arthur Hughes (23 August 1947 – 12 July 1949)
Albert Levame (3 October 1949 – 16 June 1954)
Georges-Marie de Jonghe d'Ardoye (2 Mar 1955 – 23 November 1956)
Silvio Oddi (11 January 1957 – 17 May 1962)
Mario Brini (13 June 1962 – 2 October 1965)
Apostolic pro-nuncios
Lino Zanini (4 January 1966 – 7 May 1969)
Bruno Heim (7 May 1969 – 16 July 1973)
Achille Glorieux (3 August 1973 – 1984)
Giovanni Moretti (10 July 1984 – 15 July 1989)
Antonio Magnoni (22 July 1989 – 18 March 1995)
Apostolic nuncios
Paolo Giglio (25 March 1995 – 5 February 2002)
Marco Dino Brogi (5 February 2002 – 27 January 2006)
Michael Louis Fitzgerald (15 February 2006 – 23 October 2012)
Jean-Paul Gobel (5 January 2013 – 3 January 2015)
Bruno Musarò (5 February 2015 – 29 August 2019)
Nicolas Thévenin (4 November 2019 – present)

See also
Foreign relations of the Holy See
List of diplomatic missions of the Holy See

References

Egypt
 
Egypt–Holy See relations